Pitsunda or Bichvinta is a resort town in the Gagra District of Abkhazia/Georgia. Founded by Greek colonists in the 5th century BC, Pitsunda became an important political and religious centre of the region in the antiquity and the Middle Ages. Since Soviet times it has been one of the main resorts of Abkhazia.

History

Pityus (Ancient Greek: Pityus, Πιτυοῦς, genitive Pityuntos, Πιτυοῦντος) was a large and wealthy Greek city in the antiquity. Pliny wrote in AD 77 that the city had been sacked by the Heniochi. A Roman fort was founded at Pityus in the first half of the 2nd century and a detachment of Legio XV Apollinaris was stationed there. The city was surrounded by a defensive wall, the castellum had a second line of defence built in mid-3rd century AD. Excavations guided by Andria Apakidze unearthed, in 1952, remains of three 4th-century churches and a bath with high-quality mosaic floors. The former "Great Pityus" harbour is now a mere lake within the town.

The Goths attacked the city in 255 AD after capturing the Bosporan fleet. The Roman garrison under the command of Successianus repelled the attack, however they returned in the next year, took the city and proceeded further to sack Trebizond.

Saint John Chrysostom was being led towards Pityus by the imperial soldiers, in execution of the decree of exile, when he died on the way in 407. Like Dioskurias (modern Sukhumi), it remained under Roman control within the Georgian kingdom of Colchis until the 7th century. The city passed under Abasgian control and became one of the major political and religious centres of the kingdom of Egrisi (Lazica). An archbishopric of Pitiunt was instituted in 541. In medieval Georgia, the town's name was spelled as Bichvinta. At the end of the 10th century, King Bagrat III of Georgia built there the Pitsunda Cathedral which survives to this day and contains vestiges of wall-painting from the 13th and the 16th centuries. Bichvinta also served as the seat of the Georgian Orthodox Catholicate of Abkhazia until the late 16th century when Abkhazia came under the Ottoman hegemony. In his 1911 article for the Catholic Encyclopedia, Sophrone Pétridès described Pityus as a titular see, but it is not now found in the Catholic Church's list of such sees. In the late 13th century, the area housed a short-lived Genoese trade colony called Pezonda.

Pitsunda was the favourite resort of First Secretary of the Communist Party of the Soviet Union Nikita Khrushchev. In October 1964 he happened to be vacationing in Pitsunda when he was deposed from power. Khrushchev once proposed a major dam and hydroelectric power scheme on the Bzyb River near Pitsunda, but his experts informed him that a dam built on the Bzyb River would have had catastrophic effects in causing beach erosion at Pitsunda. In the end, the dam was built on the Inguri River instead, where the impact upon the coastline was assessed to be considerably less pronounced.

Administration

Town status
On 7 February 2007, after many appeals by inhabitants, the People's Assembly of Abkhazia resolved to give Pitsunda town-status. Parliamentarians expressed the hope that the decision would help Pitsunda develop as a resort. Since becoming a town, the Mayor of Pitsunda is no longer appointed by the Governor of Gagra District but instead directly by the President of Abkhazia. On 29 January 2016, Pitsunda's town-status was formally enshrined in Abkhazia's constitution.

2011 Assembly elections

In the 2011 assembly elections, Mayor Beslan Ardzinba and six other incumbent deputies of the Assembly stood for re-election. The winning candidates were Beslan Ardzinba, Badra Avidzba, Olga Grigorenko, Chengiz Bigvava, Georgi Zardania, Gennadi Cherkezia, Gennadi Mikanba, Damia Kokoskeria and Inessa Dzkuia. On 14 February, during the first session of the new convocation, Damir Kokoskeria was elected Chairman of the Assembly over Gennadi Cherkezia, by a one vote difference.

Since 2014
Following the May 2014 Revolution and the election of Raul Khajimba as President, on 28 October 2014 he replaced Ardzinba as Mayor with Chingis Bigvava. Bigvava was not reappointed following the 2016 local elections. He was temporarily replaced by Beslan Dbar, until former head of the Association of Resorts Vitali Khutaba was temporarily appointed by Khajimba on 16 February 2017, approved by Pitsunda's town council on 20 February and permanently appointed on 27 February.

List of mayors

Notes

References

 

Populated places established in the 5th century BC
Populated coastal places in Georgia (country)
Greek colonies in Colchis
Populated places in Gagra District